Rose Pistola was an Italian restaurant in the North Beach neighborhood in San Francisco. Specializing in cuisine from the Ligurian region of Italy, it opened in 1996 and received the James Beard Foundation Award for Best New Restaurant the following year. The restaurant was named after Rose "Pistola" Evangelisti and a popular local bar she owned from the 1950s to the 1970s; chef Reed Hearon and co-owner Laurie Thomas purchased the rights from Evangelisti for an undisclosed sum and a promise that she could visit and eat as she liked.

Rose Pistola closed in February 2017, with its owners citing rising costs and diminished popularity.

See also 

 James Beard Foundation Award: 1990s
 List of Italian restaurants

References 

1996 establishments in California
2017 disestablishments in California
Cuisine of Liguria
Italian restaurants in California
James Beard Foundation Award winners
North Beach, San Francisco
Restaurants in San Francisco
Defunct restaurants in the San Francisco Bay Area
Restaurants disestablished in 2017
Restaurants established in 1996